Aleksandr Nikolayevich Khorin (born 3 May 1986) is a Russian former professional football player.

Club career
He made his Russian Football National League debut for FC Nosta Novotroitsk on 20 August 2009 in a game against FC Volgar Astrakhan. He also played in the FNL next season for FC Dynamo Saint Petersburg.

External links
 

1986 births
People from Yeysk
Living people
Russian footballers
Association football defenders
FC Kuban Krasnodar players
FC Dynamo Stavropol players
FC Dynamo Saint Petersburg players
FC Oryol players
FC Armavir players
FC Nosta Novotroitsk players
Sportspeople from Krasnodar Krai